3 Nights in the Desert is a 2014 American drama film directed by Gabriel Cowan, written by Adam Chanzit, and starring Amber Tamblyn, Wes Bentley, and Vincent Piazza.

The film premiered on January 4, 2014, at the Palm Springs International Film Festival followed by a screening on October 18, 2014, at the Twin Cities Film Festival. The film will be given a limited release in early 2015.

Premise
The drama follows three estranged friends who reunite to celebrate turning 30 years old, while also reminiscing about how they almost made it as a rock band.

Cast
 Amber Tamblyn as Anna
Wes Bentley as Travis 
 Vincent Piazza as Barry

Release
The film had a US theatrical release in early 2015 followed by the DVD and VOD release.

Festivals
3 Nights in the Desert was selected to screen at the following film festivals:
2014 Palm Springs International Film Festival
2014 Twin Cities Film Fest

Reception
Rotten Tomatoes, a review aggregator, reports that 40% of five surveyed critics gave it a positive review; the average rating was 4.8/10.  Dennis Harvey of Variety wrote that "the characters, situations and dialogue too seldom escape cliche in Gabriel Cowan’s watchable but unmemorable feature".  Stephen Farber of The Hollywood Reporter wrote, "This limp drama about a band's reunion never sings or soars."

References

External links
 
 
 
 

2014 films
American independent films
2010s English-language films
Films set in California
Films shot in Los Angeles
2014 independent films
2010s American films